Bromodomain and WD repeat-containing protein 3 is a protein that in humans is encoded by the BRWD3 gene.

Function 

The protein encoded by this gene contains a bromodomain and several WD repeats. It is thought to have a chromatin-modifying function, and may thus play a role in transcription.

Clinical significance 

Mutations in this gene can cause mental retardation or permanent paralysis X-linked type 93, which is also referred to as mental retardation X-linked with macrocephaly. This gene is also associated with translocations in patients with B-cell chronic lymphocytic leukemia.

References

External links

Further reading